The 2022 Wrexham County Borough Council election took place on 5 May 2022 to elect 56 members to Wrexham County Borough Council, the principal council of Wrexham County Borough, Wales. On the same day, elections were held to the other 21 local authorities, and community councils in Wales as part of the 2022 Welsh local elections. The previous Wrexham County Borough all-council election took place in May 2017 and future elections will take place every five years, with the next scheduled for 2027.

On 5 May 2022, the election was held in forty-one of the forty-nine wards for 2022 in Wrexham County Borough. The remaining eight had no opposition nominated by 5 April 2022, and the councillors for these wards were re-elected unopposed, with their wards not holding the election. The councillors unopposed were six independents and two conservative councillors.

Independent politicians (including "non-specified" and the "Wrexham Independents") formed the largest group in the council with twenty-three councillors, down from 2017's twenty-six, and were six short of the twenty-nine needed for a majority. The second largest group were Labour with fourteen councillors elected, up from 2017's twelve councillors. The Conservatives had the same amount councillors as in 2017 with nine. Plaid Cymru increased their number of councillors to match the Conservatives also at nine, up from their three councillors in 2017. The Liberal Democrats had their share of councillors split to one councillor, down from two in 2017.

Following the results, the council was again under no overall control. Talks between independent politicians and Labour occurred over the weekend. On 10 May 2022, the two formerly separately organised groups of independents in the council, the independents and the "Wrexham Independents" group, merged into one "mega" 21-member "Independent Group". The Independent Group was initially in talks with Welsh Labour councillors but talks collapsed over mandatory councillor anti-discrimination training. On 11 May 2022, the Independent Group formed another coalition with the Welsh Conservatives for another five-year term with a total of thirty members, a two-member majority.

Background 
Council elections in Wales were originally scheduled for May 2021 but were delayed to avoid a conflict with the 2021 Senedd election. The frequency of the elections was also increased from four years to five years to avoid future clashes, meaning (after 2022) the next council election is expected in 2027. The number of councillors is to be increased from fifty-two to fifty-six at the 2022 election, with several ward changes to ensure better electoral parity. There would be forty-nine wards up for election, up from forty-seven in the 2017 election following a recent local boundary review.

An Independent–Welsh Conservatives coalition group was formed following the 2017 local election and were in control of the council since 2017 up to the election.

Local political context 
In the 2019 United Kingdom general election, Conservative candidates won the constituencies of Wrexham and Clwyd South for the first time in their existence. The constituencies were generally considered to be Labour heartlands part of its "red wall", and were won by Labour in the June 2017 election. Sarah Atherton was elected for the Conservatives to represent the Wrexham constituency with 15,199 votes, and Simon Baynes for Clwyd South with 16,222 votes. Atherton is the first Female MP to be elected to the Wrexham seat since its creation in 1918, and the first female Conservative MP elected to Westminster representing a Welsh constituency.

On 31 January 2020, the UK left the EU, with the county borough in the 2016 referendum, voting  in favour of Leave.

In the 2021 Senedd election, Welsh Labour incumbents for the Senedd constituencies of Wrexham and Clwyd South covering the county borough were re-elected, despite media predictions and polling stating that one or both constituencies should follow the 2019 UK general election results and be won by Welsh Conservative candidates with a tight margin. For the 2021 Police and Crime Commissioner election, Andy Dunbobbin of the Labour and Co-operative party received the most votes (98,034) in the county borough.

Between 2017 and 2021, various community councils had by-elections, leading to three independent, four Welsh Labour, one Plaid Cymru, and five non-aligned candidates elected. An additional independent candidate was elected to Rhosllanerchrugog Community Council's Pant ward in September 2017 but was replaced by a Welsh Labour candidate in a by-election five months later. Eight elections in this period were uncontested.

On 20 September 2018, an independent candidate for community councillor for Gwersyllt North was elected with 98 votes. The councillor was later replaced in another by-election on 27 February 2020 leading to the Plaid Cymru candidate being elected with 189 votes.

On 18 March 2021, a by-election for the council's Maesydre ward occurred, leading to the Plaid Cymru candidate, Rebecca Martin, being elected with 150 votes, over the Welsh Labour (133 votes) and Welsh Conservative (123 votes) candidates.

On 28 October 2021, a by-election in the ward of Gresford East and West was held following the resignation of the incumbent Conservative candidate. The Welsh Conservatives were able to hold onto the ward, with Jeremy Kent being elected for the ward with 351 votes.

On 17 December 2021, in the neighbouring English constituency of North Shropshire, the Liberal Democrat candidate overturned a 23,000 (2019) Conservative majority following the former MP Owen Paterson's scandal.

Council context 
In 2021, the council submitted bids for UK City of Culture 2025 on behalf of the county borough, and a separate bid for awarding the then town of Wrexham the status of a city for the 2022 Platinum Jubilee of Queen Elizabeth II civic honours. In October 2021, the council's bid for UK City of Culture 2025 made it onto the competition's shortlist of only 8 shortlisted places in the UK, outbidding 12 other places (20 applied in total) and being the only one of the five bids from Wales making it onto the shortlist. In March 2022, Wrexham County Borough's bid for City of Culture made onto the competition's shortlist of only four places. Wrexham's city status bid was submitted in December 2021 to local controversy. Protests against the city status bid, led by Plaid Cymru, were held outside Wrexham's Guildhall, the council's main building. A public consultation into the city status bid revealed that of those surveyed, 61% did not believe Wrexham should be awarded city status at all. Within the council, political groups threatened to walk out over the debate of city status. The council was criticised for ignoring the survey's results by submitting a bid. Wrexham's city status bid is one of 39 bids across the UK and territories, it is the only bid from Wales, following Merthyr Tydfil's withdrawal of their bid. It is hoped that being the only Welsh bid leads to increased chances of Wrexham winning city status if the Queen awards city status to at least one town in the four countries of the United Kingdom. Wrexham has applied for city status three other times, in 2000, 2002 and 2012, with the 2012 bid lost to St Asaph, Denbighshire. Following the election and unrelated to it, on 20 May 2022, it was announced that Wrexham would be awarded city status through letters patent later in 2022. However, on 31 May 2022, it had lost its bid for UK City of Culture to Bradford, but was formally awarded city status on 1 September 2022.

In January 2022, the council considered raising salaries for councillors to encourage more skilled and more diverse candidates for the 2022 election.

Changes since 2017

Nominations 
The deadline for councillor nominations was 4 April 2022 at 16:00. 146 candidates were nominated, a decline of 9 from 155 in 2017. These nominees include: 48 independents (down 13), 30 Welsh Labour (down 9), 28 Welsh Conservatives (up 8), 24 Plaid Cymru (up 9), 8 Welsh Liberal Democrats (down 5), 4 Wales Green Party (up 2), 3 non-aligned and 1 Reform UK candidate.

Due to a lack of competing candidates for some electoral wards, upon the deadline for councillor nominees, eight councilors were re-elected due to no competition. These uncontested seats represent 14.29% of the total seats in the election, cancelling the election for 14,583 electors. Wards with only the incumbent or one contender standing would not be holding the ward election. The eight wards with no competition, is an increase from the three non-contending wards in the 2017 election.

The eight wards and councillors not facing competition, and are re-elected prior to the election are:

 Esclusham (Mark Pritchard; Independent; Council Leader)
 Garden Village (Andy Williams; Independent)
 Stansty (David Bithell; Independent)
 Borras Park (Debbie Wallice; Welsh Conservatives)
 Chirk South (Terry Evans; Independent)
 Cartrefle (Ronnie Prince; Independent; Mayor of Wrexham)
 Dyffryn Ceiriog (Trevor Bates; Independent)
 Holt (Michael Morris; Welsh Conservatives)

Ward changes 

In July 2021, the Welsh Government accepted the various ward change proposals made by the Local Democracy and Boundary Commission for Wales, with only slight modification, for Wrexham County Borough. The number of councillors will increase by four, from 52 to a total of 56, giving an average of 1,801 electors per councillor. These took effect from May 2022 following the election. The changes gave a better parity of representation. The Welsh Government rejected three recommendations on the names of three wards. Twenty-four wards remained unchanged. Seven wards have two councillors, up from four wards having two councillors in 2017.

Of the other wards, and not mentioning minor boundary changes, the major changes are:

 New wards; Acrefair North (from Plas Madoc ward and Cefn community), Bangor Is-y-Coed and Rhos.
 Acton ward expanded to include Maesydre as Acton and Maesydre
 Bronington ward expanded to include Hanmer as Bronington and Hanmer
 Bryn Cefn expanded to include parts of Brynteg ward
 Gwenfro ward expanded to include parts of New Broughton and Brynteg wards
 Parts of Abenbury wards moved to Whitegate ward, parts of Whitegate ward (near Newton Street) moved to Smithfield ward, and parts of Smithfield ward moved to Wynnstay ward
 Split Cefn ward (a two councillor ward) into separate East and West wards (one councillor each), as Cefn East and Cefn West.
 Refer to the dually named Dyffryn Ceiriog/Ceiriog Valley ward by only its Welsh name, Dyffryn Ceiriog
 Parts of Offa ward transferred to Erddig ward
 Parts of Brynyffynnon ward transferred to Offa ward
 Split Gwersyllt East and South (a two councillor ward) into separate East and South wards (one councillor each), as Gwersyllt East and Gwersyllt South
 Abolish Johnstown ward, Plas Madoc ward, and Maesydre ward
 Overton ward expanded to include Maelor South as Overton and Maelor South
 Pant ward merged with Johnstown ward as Pant and Johnstown with two councillors.
 Various minor boundary changes
 Shrink the Ponciau ward, removing one of its two councillors.
 Wards of Acton and Maesydre (merged ward), Brymbo, Pant and Johnstown (merged ward), Rhosnesni, and Rossett, become two-councillor wards.
 Introduction of Welsh language names used alongside English language names for some wards.

No changes performed on the following wards:

Overview of results 
The election was held on 5 May 2022, no party gained a majority of seats, making the council under no overall control. Four councillors were added for the 2022 election. Below is a table comparing the seat numbers of the 2022 and 2017 election using notional election results, which uses an estimated version of 2017's results using 2022 boundaries.

Notional results 
Below is an election summary table using notional election results. These are based on an estimated 2017 result using 2022's electoral boundaries, which are then compared to 2022's results. Compared to 2017, there is an increase of four councillors on the council, and various ward boundary changes. Data and calculations are provided by BBC News. Turnout was 36.47%, down from the 40% in 2017.

|}

Summarised ward results

Aftermath 
Following the results, the council was under no overall control, with no single party holding a majority of councillors. Independents were initially in talks with Welsh Labour councillors over the 7–8 May weekend.

On 10 May 2022, the two formerly separately organised groups of independents in the council, the Independents, led by Mark Pritchard, and the "Wrexham Independents" group, led by David A Bithell, merged into one "mega" "the Independent Group". The group contains twenty-one of the twenty-three independent politicians elected, with Mike Davies and Ronnie Prince being the only two independents not join the group. It is led by incumbent council leader and deputy leader, Mark Pritchard and David A Bithell respectively. On the start of more talks between Labour and the Independent Group, Labour Cllr Davies, questioned whether the merger was an attempt to stay in power, and questioned the relationship between Cllr Pritchard and Cllr Bithell over a rumoured falling out prior to the election. However, Cllr Davies added if they are "able to reconcile their differences" and have a "new and ambitious agenda", then Welsh Labour would welcome the merger.

On 11 May 2022, the Independent Group formed another coalition with the Welsh Conservatives for the next five-year term following an agreement between the two. The coalition would have 30 members, a two councillor majority on the 56 seat council. Labour Cllr Davies said that the IndependentConservatives deal was based on "pure self-interest" "to protect their own positions". Leader of Plaid Cymru in the council, Marc Jones also accused the deal to be more focused in retaining power than representation. Welsh Labour leader in the council, Dana Davies claimed talks between the two failed due to Labour's requirement that any deal involves all councillors undertaking training on addressing anti-Semitism, homophobia, racism and sexism. Cllr Davies described this deal to have been a "UK-first" and "ground-breaking" if it were to have been agreed. Cllr Davies also said that every member would have to sign up a motion condemning racism and misogyny. Talks with Plaid Cymru were ruled out from the beginning by the independents due to Plaid Cymru's disagreement with Mark Pritchard's leadership.

The Independent Group and the Welsh Conservatives following the announcement describe it to be "an exciting time for Wrexham", and Cllr Pritchard and Conservative group leader Hugh Jones said that they are "please to have reached a workable agreement [...] we will continue to build on our success".

Opposition in the council will be Welsh Labour, Plaid Cymru, the two non-aligned independents, and the Liberal Democrats councillor.

Full ward results 
Incumbent councillors are marked with a *. Councillors who served for different (including abolished) wards are marked with **.

Acrefair North (one seat)

Acton and Maesydre (two seats)

Bangor Is-y-Coed (one seat)

Borras Park (one seat)

Bronington and Hanmer (one seat)

Brymbo (two seats)

Bryn Cefn (one seat)

Brynyffynnon (one seat)

Cartrefle (one seat)

Cefn East (one seat)

Cefn West (one seat)

Chirk North (one seat)

Chirk South (one seat)

Coedpoeth (two seats)

Dyffryn Ceiriog (one seat)

Erddig (one seat)

Esclusham (one seat)

Garden Village (one seat)

Gresford East and West (one seat)

Grosvenor (one seat)

Gwenfro (one seat)

Gwersyllt East (one seat) 

David Griffiths and Tina Mannering were the two incumbent councillors for the former Gwersyllt East and South ward, and elected in 2012 for such ward.

Gwersyllt North (one seat)

Gwersyllt South (one seat)

Gwersyllt West (one seat)

Hermitage (one seat)

Holt (one seat)

Little Acton (one seat)

Llangollen Rural (one seat)

Llay (two seats)

Marchwiel (one seat)

Marford and Hoseley (one seat)

Minera (one seat)

New Broughton (one seat)

Offa (one seat)

Overton and Maelor South (one seat)

Pant and Johnstown (two seats)

Penycae (one seat)

Penycae and Ruabon South (one seat)

Ponciau (one seat) 

Ponciau was reduced from a two-seat ward to a one-seat ward for the 2022 election. Both incumbents stood for re-election.

Queensway (one seat)

Rhos (one seat)

Rhosnesni (two seats)

Rossett (two seats) 

Rossett gained an additional councillor seat for 2022.

Ruabon (one seat)

Smithfield (one seat)

Stansty (one seat)

Whitegate (one seat)

Wynnstay (one seat)

See also 
 Wrexham County Borough Council elections

Notes

References 

Wrexham
Wrexham County Borough Council elections